A Raccoons Lunch was a compilation by Joe 90 of demos from the band's inception, unreleased masters and songs recorded for movies.

The album includes "When You Arrive" from the soundtrack to the film Boys and Girls and a cover of Laura Nyro's "And When I Die", the end title from the 2000 New Line Cinema movie Final Destination.

The record was released to support the 2000 tour, before the band went back into the studio to record the follow-up to Dream This. That record remains unreleased.

Track listing

Personnel
Chris Seefried – vocals, electric guitar, acoustic 12 string guitar, percussion, samples, drums (on "Gone")
Gary DeRosa – piano, casio, wurlitzer, percussion, background vocals, guitar (on "Gone")
Craig Ruda – bass
Adam Hamilton – drums, electric guitar, keyboards, loops

Additional personnel
Jim Wirt – production, mixing
Robert Hawes – mixing, engineering
Jeffrey Bender – photography
Peter Reitzfeld – photography
Patrik Giordino – photography

References 

2000 albums
Albums produced by Chris Seefried
Joe 90 (band) albums